Silver tetrafluoroborate is an inorganic compound with the chemical formula AgBF4. It is a white solid that dissolves in polar organic solvents as well as water.  In its solid state, the Ag+ centers are bound to fluoride.

Preparation
Silver tetrafluoroborate is prepared by the reaction between boron trifluoride and silver oxide in the presence of benzene.

Laboratory uses
In the inorganic and organometallic chemistry laboratory, silver tetrafluoroborate, sometimes referred to "silver BF-4", is a useful reagent. In dichloromethane, silver tetrafluoroborate is a moderately strong oxidant. Similar to silver hexafluorophosphate, it is commonly used to replace halide anions or ligands with the weakly coordinating tetrafluoroborate anions. The abstraction of the halide is driven by the precipitation of the appropriate silver halide.

References

Tetrafluoroborates
Silver compounds
Oxidizing agents